Kim Hong-kyun is the Special Representative for Korean Peninsula Peace and Security Affairs for the Ministry of Foreign Affairs of the Republic of Korea.

On April 10, 2017, Wu Dawei, the Chinese envoy for international efforts to end North Korea's nuclear weapons program met with Kim Hong-Kyun in Seoul, to discuss the issue in detail.

References 

1961 births
Living people
Seoul National University alumni
University of Virginia alumni
South Korean diplomats
Ambassadors of South Korea to Germany